The Leica M-E (Typ 240) is a digital rangefinder camera announced by Leica Camera on June 24, 2019. The Leica M-E (Typ 240) is part of the long running Leica M mount line. It features a 24 Megapixels full-frame CMOS sensor (with a top ISO of 6400), Leica's Maestro processor, and a 2GB buffer for sustained burst capture. Video can be captured at 1080/30p. As with all Leica M-series models, the camera is hand-built and weather-sealed. The camera is finished in "Anthracite Paint" with black leather wrap and limited to 700 units worldwide.

The Leica M-E (Typ 240) is a successor of the Leica M-E (Typ 220) and the Leica M (Typ 262).

References

External links
 

Leica M-mount cameras
Digital rangefinder cameras
Cameras introduced in 2019